This article details the Cronulla-Sutherland Sharks rugby league football club's 2005 season.

Season summary
The Sharks started season 2005 brightly; at one stage they were joint ladder leaders after round 11. Early season highlights included wins over the 2003 premiers Penrith in the opening round, Parramatta in round three at Parramatta Stadium, 2004 premiers the Bulldogs at home in round four, North Queensland in round five, the Melbourne Storm in Melbourne in round eight, the New Zealand Warriors in Perth in round nine, the Canberra Raiders at Canberra Stadium in round ten and again over the Penrith Panthers at Penrith in round eleven. However, the season would fall apart with losses to Parramatta at home (the Sharks trailed 22-0 at halftime before rallying in the second half to go down 34-26), North Queensland in Townsville, the eventual premiers Wests Tigers at Campbelltown in round 14 before winning against the Sydney Roosters at home in round fifteen. Three more wins followed; a thrilling 30-26 golden point win over the struggling but resurgent Newcastle Knights at home with Vince Mellars scoring the winning try, a 40-16 hammering of the Melbourne Storm at home in what was now-Dragons premiership player Beau Scott's debut match and a massive 68-6 annihilation of Manly in round 24. Late season losses to Souths, St. George Illawarra, the Wests Tigers, Sydney Roosters and the Newcastle Knights in Newcastle all proved costly. The Sharks finished seventh, equal with Manly but higher courtesy of the round 24 result, making the finals for the first time since 2002 but eliminated by the Dragons 28-22 in front of a massive Wollongong crowd in the first round.

The Sharks' round two loss to the Manly-Warringah Sea Eagles was marred by the sickening injury suffered by Keith Galloway as a result of a high elbow shot from Manly winger John Hopoate. Galloway missed a huge part of the 2005 season partly  as a result from the injury and due to limited opportunities at Cronulla he signed with the Wests Tigers for the 2006 season onwards. For his part, Hopoate was sacked by the Sea Eagles after receiving a mammoth 17-week ban by the NRL Judiciary.

Ladder

Awards
Player of the year- Danny Nutley
Chairman’s Award - Paul Gallen
Rookie of the Year - Phillip Leuluai
Try of the Year - David Peachey
Premier League Player of the Year - Nathan Merritt
Jersey Flegg Player of the Year - Jacob Selmes
Jersey Flegg Player’s Player - Mitch Brown

References

Cronulla-Sutherland Sharks seasons
Cronulla-Sutherland Sharks season